Mathilde Berghofer-Weichner (23 January 1931, in Munich – 29 May 2008, in Munich) was a German politician, representative of the Christian Social Union of Bavaria. She studied legal science in Munich. She was elected to the Landtag of Bavaria between 1970 and 1994.

See also
List of Bavarian Christian Social Union politicians

References

Ministers of the Bavaria State Government
Christian Social Union in Bavaria politicians
1931 births
2008 deaths
Politicians from Munich
Knights Commander of the Order of Merit of the Federal Republic of Germany